Carly Pope (born August 28, 1980) is a Canadian actress. She is best known for her roles on The WB's drama series Popular (1999–2001), supernatural drama series The Collector (2004–2005), USA Network's legal drama series Suits (2016–2017) and The CW's Arrow (2016–2017).

Early life
Pope was born and raised in Vancouver, British Columbia, with an older brother, Kris, also an actor, and a younger brother, Alexander. She was trained as a dancer until she became active in theater during high school. She appeared in plays such as The Odd Couple, playing Mickey, and A Midsummer Night's Dream, playing Titania. She attended Lord Byng Secondary high school.

Career
Pope started her career with several small roles, such as Disturbing Behavior, Snow Day, Aliens in the Wild, Wild West, and Night Man, before being cast as Sam McPherson on The WB's comedy-drama television series Popular (1999–2001). The series followed two teenage girls, Pope and Leslie Bibb, who reside on opposite ends of the popularity spectrum at their high school, but are forced to get along when their single parents meet on a cruise ship and get married. Pope was named one of Teen People's 25 Hottest Stars Under 25 in 2000. She has appeared on the cover of several magazines, including Seventeen, Teen, Curve and Medusa, and in pictorials for FHM and Razor. Her breakthrough role was playing Abbey in Disturbing Behavior (1998), who was in a flashback sequence, but it was cut when the film was released.

Pope had several roles in film and television, including The Glass House, Jeff Probst's Finder's Fee, and Orange County. In 2004 she had starred as Maya Kandinski in  The Collector. In 2005 she was a guest-star in an episode of FOX's Tru Calling and played an aspiring social worker in the film Eighteen.

In 2007, Pope starred in the Power Up project Itty Bitty Titty Committee, and in Martin Gero's ' intelligent sex comedy ' and Toronto International Film Festival hit, Young People Fucking. In 2009, she appeared in FOX's hit thriller, 24, as Samantha Roth, the president's son's girlfriend.

Pope joined the main cast of the NBC legal drama television series Outlaw in 2010, portraying Lucinda Pearl. In 2015, Pope co-produced the Canadian documentary film Highway of Tears. She portrayed architect Tara Messer on USA Network's legal drama series Suits (2016–2017). On July 26, 2019, The Hollywood Reporter announced that Pope will appear in Hallmark Channel's Christmas-themed television film, Double Holiday (2019) opposite Kristoffer Polaha.

Personal life
On December 29, 2009, Pope and her brother, Kris, were driving a black BMW down West Georgia Street in Downtown Vancouver when David Fomradas, 31, of Alberta jumped on top of the car and yelled at them to run him over. When Kris got out of the car, Fomradas jumped in the front seat and drove the vehicle into the new CBC studios. Carly suffered a broken rib and two cracked vertebrae, Kris suffered severe injuries to his ankle, and a passerby was also injured.

Filmography

Film

Television

Awards and nominations

References

External links

 
 

1980 births
Actresses from Vancouver
Canadian film actresses
Canadian television actresses
Living people
20th-century Canadian actresses
21st-century Canadian actresses